Jacinto Gómez Pasillas (born 7 December 1940) is a Mexican politician from the New Alliance Party. He has served as Deputy of the LII and LX Legislatures of the Mexican Congress representing Chihuahua.

References

1940 births
Living people
People from Chihuahua (state)
Members of the Chamber of Deputies (Mexico)
New Alliance Party (Mexico) politicians
21st-century Mexican politicians